The discography of Doug Sahm started in 1955 with the release of "A Real American Joe" on Sarg Records. Sahm fronted three bands early in his career: The Pharaohs, The Dell-Kings and The Markays. He released the song "Crazy Daisy" (1959), and he had a local hit in San Antonio, Texas with "Why Why Why" (1960) on Renner Records. Sahm had another local hit with "Crazy, Crazy Feeling" (1961). After he disbanded the Sir Douglas Quintet in 1972, he was signed by Atlantic Records in October 1972, and he released his solo debut album Doug Sahm and Band.

As his record sales continued to decline in the mid 1970s, Sahm rarely performed concerts outside of the Austin club scene. He started the 1980s recording for Takoma Records. He then moved to the Swedish label Sonet Records. With Sonet Records, Sahm found local success in Sweden and Scandinavia. By 1989, he recorded for Antone's Record Label. In 1999, Sahm started his own label, Tornado Records. His last album, entitled The Return of Wayne Douglas, was released posthumously by his label in 2000.

Studio albums

Live albums

Collaboration albums

Singles

References

Country music discographies
Discographies of American artists